Bromma Stockholm Airport (formerly Stockholm-Bromma Flygplats)  is a Swedish domestic and minor international airport in Stockholm. Bromma is Sweden's third-busiest airport by passenger traffic and take-offs and landings as of 2015.

History

Development
During the 1930s the need for a proper airport for Stockholm, the capital city of Sweden, became urgent. The airport was opened on 23 May 1936 by King Gustav V, and was the first airport in Europe to have paved runways from the start. During World War II Swedish and British aircraft flew to the United Kingdom from Bromma Airport. Since these flights sometimes carried Norwegian and Danish refugees the airport became of interest for German spies, and two Swedish Douglas DC-3 that had taken off from Bromma were shot down by the Germans during the war. After the war the airport flourished, two noted airlines that operated from the airport were Aktiebolaget Aerotransport (ABA) which subsequently became the Swedish partner in Scandinavian Airlines System (SAS) and Linjeflyg (the Swedish main domestic airline which was later acquired by SAS). However the runway of Bromma was too short for the jet age and for intercontinental traffic in the 1960s (e.g. DC-8), and the capacity limit of Bromma could be foreseen, therefore the Stockholm Arlanda Airport was built. Also the airport, originally built in an almost rural area, became with the large raise in the population of Stockholm and associated housing projects, located inside a major city with associated noise pollution.

With the opening of the Arlanda Airport in 1960–62, all international traffic moved there, the domestic traffic followed in 1983. Bromma became the domain of business jets, general aviation and flight schools in addition to government use. Several of the old hangars were separated from the airport area and turned into shopping outlets adjacent to the airport. After the 1992 deregulation of civil aviation in Sweden, Malmö Aviation started services to Gothenburg, Malmö and London City Airport, then the airport has experienced something of a renaissance. In 2002 a new control tower was put into use on Ranhammarshöjden and the terminal which had become rundown after years of neglect was renovated. The airport underwent further improvements in 2005 and is now capable of separating passengers arriving from within and outside of the Schengen area.

Sweden's first FBO (fixed-base operator), Grafair Jet Center, was built in 2004 at Bromma Airport. The Swedish CAA at the time, Luftfartsverket, announced a bidding process in 2003 for a contract to build a General Aviation terminal at the airport in order to improve the ground services provided for the general aviation customers flying to Stockholm and Bromma Airport. Grafair won the contract and went on to build the FBO, which was finished 11 November 2004. The Grafair Jet Center was voted the 3rd best international FBO in May 2008 in AIN - Aviation International News.

During the COVID-19 pandemic in 2020, all flights at Bromma were cancelled during a period. BRA, the most frequent airline at Bromma, decided to cancel all its flights from 6 April 2020. BRA restarted limited operations in late 2020.

On 16 May 2021, Bromma Airport tram station was opened.

Future
Expansion of the airport would be limited by noise issues, a lack of space, and the necessity to preserve the cultural heritage (the airport buildings). With the completion of the third runway at Stockholm Arlanda Airport there is a capacity surplus at that airport, and there have been ongoing debates on whether to use the land occupied by Bromma Airport for residential and commercial purposes for several years. When the airport opened in 1936 the surrounding area was mostly rural, however as the city has expanded noise has become an issue. Therefore, certain measures have been put in place, such as limiting airport operations to the daytime, limiting the type of commercial aircraft which are allowed to operate from the airport and soundproofing residential homes near the airport. Bromma's main advantage over the much larger Arlanda Airport is its proximity to the centre of Stockholm (about 8 km or 5 miles). However, Arlanda's fast rail link, completed in 1999, means that Bromma's competitive edge in this respect is somewhat lost.

In late 2014 the Red-Green alliance won control of both Stockholm city and the government in the general election. They stated plans to completely shut down the airport and build apartments instead back then.

In May 2021, both the Swedish government and the airport's operator announced renewed plans to go ahead with the closure of the airport in the foreseeable future to make way for housing projects on the site. In October 2021, the Swedish government issued a report stating that Stockholm Bromma Airport could close between 2025 and 2027. All air traffic after the closure will be consolidated to Stockholm Arlanda Airport.

Airlines and destinations

The following airlines operate regular scheduled and charter flights at Stockholm-Bromma:

Statistics

Other facilities
Bromma Airport is home of two flight clubs (Stockholms Flygklubb and SAS Flygklubb), as well as a flight school (LidAir).

The state aviation, which operates VIP flights for the ministers of the government, the royal family and other high ranked government officials, is based on Bromma Airport.

Ground transportation

Bus
Airport coaches travel directly between Stockholm Bromma Airport and the City Terminal (approx. 20 min travel time).
Buses 110 and 152 of the Stockholm Transit (SL) system stop at the airport or have a bus stop close to the airport. Travel time to central Stockholm is usually 30 minutes, via Alvik or Sundbyberg. SL bus tickets must be purchased before boarding.

Tram
Trams go between the airport and Alvik which has a metro station. This tram service which was opened in May 2021 is a part of the Tvärbanan network.

Taxi
There is a taxi stand at the airport, and the proximity to central Stockholm usually ensures that the availability is sufficient at most times.

Parking
There is parking at the airport, both at the terminal, short-term and long-term parking lots. Terminal parking costs 45 Swedish kronor/h and is limited to one hour, while short-term and long-term parking is slightly less expensive depending on the length of time. The parking lots are managed by the airport company Swedavia.

Accidents and incidents
On 18 February 1951, a RAF Vickers Valetta with 22 passengers and crew on a military flight suffered a failure of the No. 2 engine and radio problems while near Stockholm Bromma Airport. Smoke was also seen coming from beneath the floor of the rear of the cabin. The crew attempted to make an emergency landing at the airport, however due to poor alignment with the runway and poor weather caused the aircraft to overshoot the runway. The aircraft climbed very poorly due to effects of airframe icing and the pilot made a forced belly landing on a clearing on high ground. One person was killed and the aircraft totally destroyed.
On 1 April 1951, a Scandinavian Airlines Douglas DC-3 on a flight from Copenhagen Kastrup Airport to Stockholm Bromma Airport crash-landed in a field near the airport. None of the 18 passengers or 4 crew members were killed, but the aircraft was a write-off.
On 15 January 1977, Linjeflyg Flight 618, tail number SE-FOZ, crashed at Kälvesta on approach to Bromma, due to ice accretion on the tailplane leading to a loss of control. All 22 people on board were killed.

See also
List of airports in Sweden
Stockholm Arlanda Airport
Stockholm Skavsta Airport
Stockholm Västerås Airport
List of the largest airports in the Nordic countries
Bromma
Swedish Civil Aviation Administration

References

External links
 
 

Airports in the Stockholm region
Transport in Stockholm
Airfields of the United States Army Air Forces Air Transport Command in the European Theater
Airports established in 1936
1936 establishments in Sweden
International airports in Sweden